In mathematics, a matrix coefficient (or matrix element) is a function on a group of a special form, which depends on a linear representation of the group and additional data. Precisely, it is a function on a compact topological group G obtained by composing a representation of G on a vector space V with a linear map from the endomorphisms of V into V 's underlying field. It is also called a representative function. They arise naturally from finite-dimensional representations of G as the matrix-entry functions of the corresponding matrix representations. The Peter–Weyl theorem says that the matrix coefficients on G are dense in the Hilbert space of square-integrable functions on G.

Matrix coefficients of representations of Lie groups turned out to be intimately related with the theory of special functions, providing a unifying approach to large parts of this theory. Growth properties of matrix coefficients play a key role in the classification of irreducible representations of locally compact groups, in particular, reductive real and p-adic groups. The formalism of matrix coefficients leads to a generalization of the notion of a modular form. In a different direction, mixing properties of certain dynamical systems are controlled by the properties of suitable matrix coefficients.

Definition 
A matrix coefficient (or matrix element) of a linear representation  of a group  on a vector space  is a function  on the group, of the type

If  is a Hilbert space, then by the Riesz representation theorem, all matrix coefficients have the form

Applications

Finite groups 
Matrix coefficients of irreducible representations of finite groups play a prominent role in representation theory of these groups, as developed by Burnside, Frobenius and Schur. They satisfy Schur orthogonality relations. The character of a representation ρ is a sum of the matrix coefficients fvi,ηi, where {vi} form a basis in the representation space of ρ, and {ηi} form the dual basis.

Finite-dimensional Lie groups and special functions 
Matrix coefficients of representations of Lie groups were first considered by Élie Cartan. 
Israel Gelfand realized that many classical special functions and orthogonal polynomials are expressible as the matrix coefficients of representation of Lie groups G. This description provides a uniform framework for proving many hitherto disparate properties of special functions, such as addition formulas, certain recurrence relations, orthogonality relations, integral representations, and eigenvalue properties with respect to differential operators. Special functions of mathematical physics, such as the trigonometric functions, the hypergeometric function and its generalizations, Legendre and Jacobi orthogonal polynomials and Bessel functions all arise as matrix coefficients of representations of Lie groups. Theta functions and real analytic Eisenstein series, important in algebraic geometry and number theory, also admit such realizations.

Automorphic forms 
A powerful approach to the theory of classical modular forms, initiated by Gelfand, Graev, and Piatetski-Shapiro, views them as matrix coefficients of certain infinite-dimensional unitary representations, automorphic representations of adelic groups. This approach was further developed by Langlands, for general reductive algebraic groups over global fields.

See also 
Peter–Weyl theorem
Spherical functions
Discrete series representation

Notes

References 
 
 
Vilenkin, N. Ja. Special functions and the theory of group representations. Translated from the Russian by V. N. Singh. Translations of Mathematical Monographs, Vol. 22 American Mathematical Society, Providence, R. I. 1968
 Vilenkin, N. Ja., Klimyk, A. U. Representation of Lie groups and special functions. Recent advances. Translated from the Russian manuscript by V. A. Groza and A. A. Groza. Mathematics and its Applications, 316. Kluwer Academic Publishers Group, Dordrecht, 1995. xvi+497 pp.  
 Vilenkin, N. Ja., Klimyk, A. U. Representation of Lie groups and special functions. Vol. 3. Classical and quantum groups and special functions. Translated from the Russian by V. A. Groza and A. A. Groza. Mathematics and its Applications (Soviet Series), 75. Kluwer Academic Publishers Group, Dordrecht, 1992. xx+634 pp.  
 Vilenkin, N. Ja., Klimyk, A. U. Representation of Lie groups and special functions. Vol. 2. Class I representations, special functions, and integral transforms. Translated from the Russian by V. A. Groza and A. A. Groza. Mathematics and its Applications (Soviet Series), 74. Kluwer Academic Publishers Group, Dordrecht, 1993. xviii+607 pp. 
 Vilenkin, N. Ja., Klimyk, A. U. Representation of Lie groups and special functions. Vol. 1. Simplest Lie groups, special functions and integral transforms. Translated from the Russian by V. A. Groza and A. A. Groza. Mathematics and its Applications (Soviet Series), 72. Kluwer Academic Publishers Group, Dordrecht, 1991. xxiv+608 pp. 
 

Representation theory of groups